The Toyota Innova is a series of multi-purpose vehicles (MPV) manufactured by the Japanese carmaker Toyota since 2004, mainly sold with three-row seating. Its official name in Indonesia is Toyota Kijang Innova, while for other countries it is simply called "Innova". For the second generation, it is known as Toyota Innova Crysta in India and Thailand. For the third generation, it received another moniker in Indonesia as the Toyota Kijang Innova Zenix and in India as the Toyota Innova HyCross.

The Innova is the replacement for wagon versions of Kijang (internally known as the Toyota Utility Vehicle), which was also marketed under different names such as Tamaraw FX/Revo, Unser, Zace and Condor. Like the outgoing Kijang, the first two generations (2004–2022) of the Innova were a rear-wheel-drive vehicle built on the body-on-frame chassis shared with the Hilux pickup truck and the Fortuner SUV under the IMV project, instead of the unibody construction commonly used by MPVs of its era. The chassis was adopted due to the perceived strength and durability which are preferred by customers mainly in Indonesia. The third-generation model introduced in 2022 switched to front-wheel-drive layout, using the GA-C platform with a unibody chassis. The change was made to make use of the hybrid powertrain (which the IMV platform cannot utilise), and to give the comfort benefits of the front-wheel-drive layout.

The Innova first entered production in Indonesia in August 2004 and has been manufactured in other emerging countries such as India, Malaysia, the Philippines, Taiwan and Vietnam. The Innova has also been marketed in Brunei, Cambodia, Myanmar, Thailand, GCC countries, Ecuador, Egypt, Jamaica and Argentina.

The name Innova comes from the English word 'innovate'.

First generation (AN40; 2004) 

In September 2004, Toyota debuted the first-generation Innova (designated AN40 series) in Indonesia. It followed the 2003 introduction of the Avanza—the replacement for low-spec versions of the Kijang. Badged as the Kijang Innova, the first-generation Innova in Indonesia was marketed as the fifth-generation Kijang to maintain the lineage with the fourth-generation model. It also had a more upmarket positioning than the latter.

Development started in 1999, and was led by Kaoru Hosokawa, the chief engineer and product planning leader of Toyota Commercial Vehicle Development Centre. Targeted annual production in Indonesia was 80,000 units, including 10,000 units for export.

Compared to the long-wheelbase fourth-generation Kijang wagon, the Innova was made  longer and  wider while gained a more rounded MPV proportions. Unlike its predecessor, the Innova could be equipped with modern safety features such as ABS and airbags as it was designated as a more global oriented model. Other technologies incorporated to the Innova include throttle-by-wire and variable valve timing. It adopted independent double wishbone front suspension with coil springs and stabilizer bar and a four-link solid axle rear suspension with a lateral rod.

Depending on the market and grade level, the Innova could be configured as a two-row five-seater vehicle (such as in Taiwan), or a three-row vehicle with either eight seats or a more upscale seven-seat layout with captain seats for the second row.

Powertrains 
The first-generation Innova was powered by either a 2.0-litre petrol  1TR-FE with VVT-i, a 2.7-litre petrol  2TR-FE with VVT-i, or a 2.5-litre  2KD-FTV D-4D common rail turbocharged diesel engine.

Petrol versions were also available in five-speed manual or four-speed automatic versions.

Updates

2008 
The facelifted Innova debuted on 26 August 2008 in Indonesia. It featured a redesigned front and rear bumper, front grille, and rear taillights. It was also launched in the Philippines in November 2008 and in India on 28 January 2009.

2011 
On 20 July 2011, Toyota launched the second facelift of the Innova in Indonesia. It featured redesigned headlights, grille, bonnet, bumpers, taillights and wheels. The interior was updated with an updated steering wheel, updated air-conditioning knobs (for non V variants), and a revised center dashboard design.

2013 
The third facelift of the Innova debuted in August 2013 in Indonesia, which introduced a revised front bumper, trunk garnish and equipment upgrades.

Markets

India 
In India, the Innova was introduced in February 2005 to replace the Qualis. It was available with twelve variants. Three variants of the Innova came with a petrol engine option which was powered by a 2.0-litre engine with electronic fuel injection. The diesel variants of the Innova are powered by a 2.5-litre engine. The available grades were E, G, GX and VX. In 2012, "Z" was made as a flagship grade above the VX. Toyota set an initial sales target of 45,000 units annually.

The Innova was sold in large numbers in India (where it is known as an MUV)—primarily serving the tourist taxi market and fleet operations of large technology business process outsourcing companies.

In 2009, a facelift was introduced with exterior cosmetic changes, and the inclusion of an intercooler.

A second facelift was introduced in 2012 at the 11th Auto Expo with updated bumper designs, grille, updated headlights and newly designed alloy wheels. Steering-mounted controls for the audio and climate control system became an option.

The first-generation Innova received an update for the Indian market in 2015. With this update, all variants gained dual airbags and there were cosmetic changes such as the inclusion of dark grey two-tone alloy wheels, wood finished steering wheel, redesigned leather seats, and an oak interior colour. Rear HVAC outlets became standard as a part of this update.

Indonesia 
The Kijang Innova was introduced in Indonesia on 1 September 2004. It was initially available in E, G and V grade levels, equipped with either 2.0-litre petrol or 2.5-litre diesel engine. Manual transmission was offered in all grades, while the automatic transmission was only offered in G and V grades. The E and G grades retained three-spoke steering wheel design from the second facelift fourth-generation Kijang and first-generation Vios, while the V grade shared its four-spoke steering wheel design from the first-generation Alphard, facelifted J100 series Land Cruiser and the facelifted XV30 series Camry.

In January 2005, the 2.7 V grade was released as the flagship model. It was equipped with a 2.7-litre petrol engine, dual airbags, ABS, seven-seat layout, with no manual transmission option. It was discontinued in 2007 due to low demand caused by its relatively high price. In 2006, the V Xtra grade was released with similar equipment levels as the 2.7 V grade.

In early 2007, the engines on the Indonesian market Kijang Innova were updated to comply with the Euro 2 emission standards. It received a catalytic converter and the injection system was changed to a closed loop system. The Kijang Innova also received a front mesh grille. The E grade received rear HVAC outlets, while ABS became standard on V grade.

In January 2008, the G grade could be optioned as a seven-seater with the "Captain Seat" sub-grade.

The facelifted Kijang Innova was released on 26 August 2008 with updated front bumper and grille design, taillights and bumpers, and redesigned wheels. Two-tone interior colour (grey and beige) became standard. Audio steering switches became standard on V grade. This model also featured automatic climate control and side door impact beams. At the 17th Indonesia International Motor Show in July 2009, the G Luxury and V Luxury grades were introduced as replacements for the V Xtra grade. In August 2009, the petrol-only J grade was introduced as the base model. At the 18th Indonesia International Motor Show in July 2010, the E grade with automatic transmission was released with the same alloy wheel design as the G grade.

On 20 July 2011, the Kijang Innova received a second facelift. The E grade received alloy wheels (shared the same design with G grade), while the J grade received center caps. The steering wheel design was changed to one shared with the XV40 series Camry and E140 series Corolla Altis (for G and V grades), while the J and E grades received a redesigned three-spoke steering wheel that was later used on the second-generation Avanza.

On 19 August 2013, the third facelift of the Kijang Innova was launched. Changes consist of a larger grille, redesigned bumpers and an updated trunk garnish exclusive to the E, G and V grades. A four-spoke steering wheel and dual airbags are also standard equipment on this model. In August 2014, the Kijang Innova was updated again with the redesigned wheels exclusive to the G, V and Luxury grades (also used on the E grade in some export markets), while the previous wheels used on the second facelift model V grade were installed on the E grade. The Luxury grades were received a redesigned rear body kit.

Malaysia 
The Innova was launched on 27 May 2005 replacing the Unser and was offered in two variants: the E and G, both powered by the 1TR-FE 2.0-litre engine with VVT-i. The powertrains available were either paired with a five-speed manual transmission or a four-speed automatic transmission.

Philippines 
The Innova was introduced in 2005 to replace the Revo. Grade levels include the J, the E (mid-level model with power features, airbags, and only available with a diesel engine; a petrol engine variant was added for 2008), the G (middle model with carry over equipment levels from the E grade albeit with leather seats and interiors), and the V (high end model, which was introduced in the last quarter of 2006 and only available with an automatic transmission, captains seats on the middle row, and high end audio system).

In 2010, an upgraded version of the Innova E grade called the Sport Runner was offered. It was only available with a 2.5-litre diesel engine and was offered with either a 5-speed manual or 4-speed automatic transmission. It was offered until early 2012 and in that same year, a facelifted version of the Innova was launched, featuring a redesigned front bumper, headlights, and taillights.

In early 2014, another facelifted version of the Innova was launched; a redesigned front bumper and tailgate were parts of this update.

In June 2015, TMP offered a limited edition 1 Million Innova with GPS navigation, rear spoiler and 1 Million badge, and a special Jade Green Metallic exterior colour.

The first-generation Innova was sold over 140,000 units in the Philippines.

South Africa 
The Innova was introduced in its second facelift form in October 2011, sitting in between the Verso and the smaller Avanza. Equipped with a 2.7-litre engine mated exclusively to a 5-speed manual, it was offered with eight-seater variant and a more upscale seven-seater. The model was not replaced with the second-generation model upon its discontinuation due to poor sales and slumping demand for MPVs in the market.

Taiwan 
The Innova was introduced in Taiwan in July 2007 to replace the Zace Surf, as it was not compliant with the stricter emissions regulations. Positioned as a recreational vehicle and a commercial vehicle, the Taiwanese market Innova was only offered with a two-row, five-seater capacity. Initial models are equipped with the 2.7-litre petrol engine with J, E, G and Z grade levels. Monthly sales were targeted at 900 units. In November 2011, the 2.7-litre engine was replaced by the 2.0-litre engine with price reductions and monthly sales target of 700 units. Retaining the same initial exterior styling without a facelift, the vehicle gained black interior colour replacing beige. Production continues without significant changes until 2016, when it was discontinued without a direct successor.

Vietnam 
The Innova was introduced in January 2006. In its first year, the Innova sold 9,934 units with a share of the overall car market of 23 percent, a record in the country.

Second generation (AN140; 2015) 

The second-generation Innova, designated AN140 series, was launched in November 2015 in Indonesia. Its introduction follows the other vehicles from the IMV family, the Hilux and the Fortuner, which received newer generations in May and July respectively. The second-generation Innova featured an improved platform and newer diesel engines, with development led by executive chief engineer Hiroki Nakajima. According to Nakajima, the second-generation Innova aimed to be a "crossover MPV", in the sense of combining the essence of an MPV with the "tough, emotional elements" of an SUV.

It is  longer,  wider,  taller, and around  heavier than its predecessor. It was reported that the second-generation Innova shares "only 5% of its components with the outgoing model, which is, apparently, a few bolts and screws," according to Toyota Motor Manufacturing Indonesia (TMMIN) director of production engineering, Nandi Julianto. While keeping the same wheelbase as the previous generation, the Innova rides on a revised body-on-frame chassis that has been tweaked with a thicker side rail to offer better strength and structural rigidity.

The second-generation Innova retains its double wishbone suspension with coil springs and stabilizer up front and a four-link with coil spring and lateral rod suspension at the rear. The low end variants rode on 16-inch alloy wheels, while the top-end variant received 17-inch alloy wheels. It could be optioned with seven airbags, stability control, and hill start assist.

The second-generation Innova is fully manufactured in Indonesia and India, and also assembled by knock-down kits in Malaysia, the Philippines, and Vietnam.

Powertrains 
The 2.0-litre and 2.7-litre petrol engines are carried over from the previous model with slight modifications, while the 2.4-litre and 2.8-litre diesel engines are newer additions for this generation. Toyota claimed a 30 percent improvement in fuel efficiency for the diesel engines. The available transmission options are five-speed manual and six-speed automatic.

Markets

India 
For the Indian market, the second-generation Innova was showcased at Auto Expo in February 2016. Marketed as the Innova Crysta, this generation was launched in May 2016. Exclusive for this model is a 2.8-litre 1GD-FTV inline-four turbocharged diesel engine. The Innova Crysta was launched in May 2016 as with two diesel engine options: the 2.8-litre diesel and the 2.4-litre diesel. The 2.8-litre engine gets the six-speed automatic transmission with sequential shift while the 2.4-litre gets the five-speed manual transmission. In August 2016, the 2.7-litre petrol engine option was introduced, in response to the ban on diesel vehicles with engine capacities over 2,000 cc in Delhi and NCR. The petrol engine is mated with either a 5-speed manual or a 6-speed automatic transmission with sequential shift according to different grade levels.

Grade levels are G, V, and the flagship Z. In May 2017, Toyota launched the Innova Touring Sport which feature exterior elements from the Indonesian market Kijang Innova Venturer. The lineup received an update in October 2017 with a 6-speed manual transmission.

In 2020, the 2.8-litre 1GD-FTV engine was discontinued for the Indian market due to the implementation of Bharat Stage 6 emission standard. The 2.8-litre automatic variant was subsequently replaced with the 2.4-litre automatic variant. However, the 2.4-litre 2GD-FTV diesel in the automatic variant produces the same torque of  that the 2.8-litre automatic produced and the 2.4-litre manual produces the same torque of  that the 2.8-litre manual produced. To comply with the Bharat Stage 6 emission norms, the engine is equipped with a DPF + SCR system for exhaust after-treatment and mandates the use of diesel exhaust fluid.

The updated Innova Crysta was launched in India on 24 November 2020, with changes mainly in the front styling.

The Innova Crysta was reintroduced to be sold alongside the newer Innova HyCross in January 2023 with a restyled front end. The petrol engine option and automatic transmission was dropped, leaving the 2.4-litre diesel engine with manual transmission.

Indonesia 
The second-generation Kijang Innova (colloquially known as "Kijang Innova Reborn") was launched in Jakarta, Indonesia on 23 November 2015. Initial grade levels of the Indonesian market Kijang Innova are the base G, the mid-level V and the flagship Q grade. As the Kijang Innova is moving upmarket to make room for the second-generation Sienta, the J and E grades from the previous generation was removed. The engine options in the Indonesian market are the 2.0-litre 1TR-FE petrol and 2.4-litre 2GD-FTV common rail diesel.

On 16 January 2017, the diesel-engined Q grade was replaced by Venturer grade (available in both petrol and diesel engines). It has a more pronounced crossover SUV-inspired look with the inclusion of aerokits, black 17-inch alloy wheels. It is also equipped with leather upholstery and captain seats. The grade omitted the "Kijang" badge and was marketed separately from the lesser grades.

On 10 August 2017, the Kijang Innova received a minor update. For the G grade, the plastic grille ornament was replaced with a chrome grille ornament, while the V grade received LED projector headlights. The 2.0 Q grade received 17-inch alloy wheels from the discontinued Q diesel grade. This updated Kijang Innova was introduced at the 25th Gaikindo Indonesia International Auto Show.

On 2 August 2018, the petrol engine on the Kijang Innova was updated to comply with the Euro 4 emission standards. It was introduced during the 26th Gaikindo Indonesia International Auto Show.

On 17 August 2020, a limited-production TRD Sportivo variant based on the G and V diesel grades was introduced. Only 2,632 units were produced.

The facelift model of the Kijang Innova was released on 15 October 2020. The Q grade was removed from the lineup and replaced by the Luxury variant of G and V grades with captain seats. It also marked the revival of Luxury variant of G and V grades, after four year and 11-months hiatus. Vehicle stability control and hill-start assist became standard on all grades.

To commemorate the 50th anniversary of Toyota-Astra Motor, the limited edition variant of the Kijang Innova was made available in April 2021. Only 50 units were sold, which consists of 30 units based on 2.0 V Luxury grade and 20 units based on 2.4 Venturer grade, both with automatic transmission.

On 31 March 2022, the diesel engine on the Kijang Innova was updated to comply with the Euro 4 emission standards. It was introduced during the 29th Indonesia International Motor Show.

Since November 2022, with the introduction of the third-generation model, the G petrol and diesel variants with manual transmission initially became the only second-generation Kijang Innova variants sold for fleet markets. The diesel variant with automatic transmission was reintroduced later in March 2023.

Malaysia 
The second-generation Innova was launched in Malaysia on 5 December 2016. It is assembled by UMW Toyota Motor at its Shah Alam facility in Malaysia. Initial grade levels were the E and G models.

In September 2017, UMW Toyota introduced a flagship variant, called the 2.0 X.

The facelifted Innova was launched in Malaysia on 2 February 2021. Grade levels remained the same as the pre-facelift model.

Philippines 
The second-generation Innova was launched in the Philippine market on 26 February 2016. Standard grade levels include the base J, the mid-level E, the higher-spec G and the top-of-the-line V. A special variant called the Touring Sport was also available based on the E grade. Initially, all grade levels were powered by either a 2.8-litre 1GD-FTV turbocharged four cylinder diesel engine or a 2.0-litre 1TR-FE four-cylinder petrol engine mated to either a 5-speed manual or a 6-speed automatic transmission with sequential shift. The second-generation Innova rolled off Toyota's assembly plant in Santa Rosa, Laguna on 14 April 2016 and went on sale a few days later.

The facelifted Innova was launched in the Philippines on 20 February 2021. Grade levels remain the same as the pre-facelift model while the petrol variants and Touring Sport models were removed from the lineup.

Saudi Arabia and UAE 
Al Futtaim Motors, the distributor of Toyota in UAE, launched the second-generation Innova on 6 April 2016. The UAE-specification is powered by the 2.7-litre 2TR-FE engine with the six-speed automatic transmission.

Thailand 
As in India, the second-generation Innova is also marketed in Thailand as the Innova Crysta. Initial grade levels were 2.0 E, 2.8 G diesel and 2.8 V diesel. The units are imported from Indonesia.

In November 2020, the facelift model of the Thai market Innova was launched. It is available in 2.0 Entry, 2.8 Crysta and 2.8 Crysta Premium grade levels.

Vietnam 
On 18 July 2016, the second-generation Innova was launched in Vietnam and its powered by a 2.0-litre 1TR-FE as an only petrol engine option. It is produced in Vĩnh Phúc and is available in E, G and V grade levels.

Safety 
In a 2016 testing under 2012–2016 ASEAN NCAP standards, the second-generation Innova received a 4-star rating for the 3-airbag variant not equipped with an electronic stability control, and a 5-star rating for the 5-airbag variant with electronic stability control.

In a 2020 testing, the second-generation Innova received a 5-star rating under 2017–2020 ASEAN NCAP standards, after the model received a standard electronic stability control.

Kijang Innova EV Concept 

The Kijang Innova EV Concept is an EV conversion prototype that was first presented on 31 March 2022 in Indonesia. The conversion was done by the Australian branch of SEA Electric, a company specialising in electric trucks conversion based in Melbourne, Australia. Five prototypes were built; three were built in Melbourne and two in Indonesia.

Third generation (AG10; 2022) 

The third-generation Innova, designated AG10 series, was launched in Indonesia on 21 November 2022 as the Kijang Innova Zenix, and in India on 25 November 2022 as the Innova HyCross. Built on the unibody, front-wheel-drive-based GA-C platform, it is powered by two engine options: the 2.0-litre M20A-FKS petrol and the 2.0-litre M20A-FXS petrol hybrid engines. Manual transmission and diesel engine options are no longer offered for this generation.

Development of the third-generation Innova was led by chief engineer Hideki Mizuma, which is also the chief engineer for the second, third, and fourth-generation Noah/Voxy, as well as the Sienna and Estima/Previa. The design concept of the third-generation Innova was described as an "Innovative Multipurpose Crossover". Similar to the second generation, the concept combines the design elements of a crossover SUV with the interior space and practicality of a minivan or MPV. Toyota shifted the A-pillars further back, while the D-pillars are tilted forward to avoid an orthodox van-like design.

With the use of the GA-C platform shared with the fourth-generation Noah/Voxy, the third-generation Innova is lighter by  compared to its predecessor.

For this generation, the Innova is equipped with a hybrid powertrain as an option. It is a fifth-generation hybrid system developed by Toyota, combining the M20A-FXS engine with a permanent magnet synchronous electric motor and a 6.5-Ah nickel-metal hydride (NiMH) battery. Positioned under the front seats, the NiMH battery is chosen over lithium-ion due to its better durability in hot weather conditions.

Other additions and changes compared the previous generation include electronic parking brake with auto brake hold as standard, dashboard-mounted gear lever, panoramic roof, Toyota Safety Sense, and second-row captain seats with "Ottoman" leg rests.

Powertrains

Markets

Indonesia 
For the Indonesian market, the model is marketed as the Kijang Innova Zenix. The name Zenix was derived from the English word 'zenith', which Toyota stated as conveying "peak performance", while the letter x represents the word "crossover". The Kijang nameplate is retained due to its popularity in the country, with Toyota in Indonesia designating the model as the seventh-generation Kijang. It is the first hybrid vehicle and the first TNGA-based vehicle to be produced by Toyota in the country.

Three grade levels are offered for the Kijang Innova Zenix: G, V and Q. The hybrid powertrain is optional on G and V grades and standard on the Q grade. Toyota Safety Sense is also standard on the latter. The Modellista accessories package is also offered as an option for the V hybrid and Q grades.

Monthly sales target of the Kijang Innova Zenix in the country is set at around 4,000 units, with planned exports to around 50 countries starting February 2023. , the petrol model of the Kijang Innova Zenix contains 85 percent of locally-sourced parts, while the hybrid version contains 60 percent as many of the electrical components are imported from Japan. While the NiMH battery is locally assembled, the M20A 2.0-litre engines are imported from India.

India 
In the Indian market, the model is marketed as the Innova HyCross. Five grade levels are offered for the Innova HyCross, which are two petrol models: G-SLF, GX; and three hybrid models: VX, ZX, and ZX (O). The highest grade received Toyota Safety Sense as standard. The entry-level petrol variant (G-SLF) will be targeted at fleet operators. It has been available for retail sales since January 2023.

Sales 

† Including the outgoing Kijang

References

External links 

  (Indonesia)

Innova
Cars introduced in 2004
2010s cars
2020s cars
Minivans
Rear-wheel-drive vehicles
Front-wheel-drive vehicles
Hybrid minivans
Partial zero-emissions vehicles
Vehicles with CVT transmission
Cars powered by longitudinal 4-cylinder engines